Ezcaray is a town and municipality in the Oja Valley in the La Rioja region of northern Spain.

The name is of Basque origin.

Demographics

Population centres
 Ezcaray
 Altuzarra
 Ayabarrena
 Azárrulla
 Cilbarrena
 Posadas
 San Antón
 Turza
 Urdanta
 Zaldierna
 Turza

Politics

Places of interest 
 Church of Santa María la Mayor
 Royal Cloth Factory of Ezcaray
 Hermitage of the Virgin of Allende
 Hermitage of Saint Barbara
 Palace of Barroeta
 Calvary of Saint Lazarus

Notable people 
 Armando Buscarini, poet
 Francisco Antonio Barbadillo Vitoria
 Pedro Antonio Barroeta y Ángel, archbishop of Lima
 Santiago Lope Gonzalo, musician and composer
 Andrés de la Calleja, painter
 Carlos Perujo
 Jaime Nava

See also
 Olmos y Robles

References

External links
 Official website
 Ski resort (in Spanish)
 Ezcaray in the Auñamendi Encyclopedia 

Municipalities in La Rioja (Spain)